Poul Bille-Holst (15 June 1894 – 9 February 1959) was a Danish painter. His work was part of the painting event in the art competition at the 1936 Summer Olympics.

References

1894 births
1959 deaths
20th-century Danish painters
Danish male painters
Olympic competitors in art competitions
People from Frederiksberg
20th-century Danish male artists